After the Divorce is a novel by Italian author Grazia Deledda.

Plot
This tragedy is set in Sardinia. Constantino Ledda is convicted on charges for murdering his wicked uncle. Constantino is innocent, but he accepts the verdict because of his wife, Giovanna. After Constantino is convicted, Giovanna has no economic means to support her family, so she divorces her husband and remarries, this time to a wealthy but cruel landowner. Constantino is released after the real killer confesses, and he and Giovanna start a forbidden romance.

Bibliography
 Title: After the Divorce
 Author: Grazia Deledda
 Translated by: Susan Ashe
 Editor Northwestern University Press, 1995
 , 9780810112490
 174 pages

External links
 
  (1905 Maria Hornor Lansdale translation)
Dopo il divorzio Original Italian text.
 

1902 Italian novels
Works by Grazia Deledda
Novels set in Italy
Sardinia in fiction